The men's 110 metres hurdles at the 2006 European Athletics Championships were held at the Ullevi on August 11 and August 12.
The world champion Ladji Doucoure was knocked out in the semifinals.

Medalists

Schedule

Results

Round 1
Qualification: First 2 in each heat (Q) and the next 6 fastest (q) advance to the semifinals.

Semifinals
First 4 of each Semifinal will be directly qualified (Q) for the Final.

Semifinal 1

Semifinal 2

Final

External links
Results

Hurdles 110
Sprint hurdles at the European Athletics Championships